The 2018 World Senior Curling Championships was held from 21 to 28 April at the Östersund Arena in Östersund, Sweden. The event was held in conjunction with the 2018 World Mixed Doubles Curling Championship. Canada won both the men's and women's events.

Men

Round Robin Standings

Playoffs

Women

Round Robin Standings

Playoffs

References

External links

World Senior Curling Championships
World Senior Curling Championships
International curling competitions hosted by Sweden
Sports competitions in Östersund
World Senior Curling Championships
World Senior Curling Championships